Wen Yang may refer to:

Wen Yang (Three Kingdoms), Cao Wei military general during the Three Kingdoms period
Wen Yang (chess player), Chinese chess player
Wen Yong Yang, American track and field coach